This article show all participating team squads at the 2006 FIVB Volleyball World League, played by 16 countries from 14 July to 27 August 2006. The Final Round was held in Moscow, Russia.

The following is the  roster in the 2006 FIVB Volleyball World League.

The following is the  roster in the 2006 FIVB Volleyball World League.

The following is the  roster in the 2006 FIVB Volleyball World League.

The following is the  roster in the 2006 FIVB Volleyball World League.

The following is the  roster in the 2006 FIVB Volleyball World League.

The following is the  roster in the 2006 FIVB Volleyball World League.

The following is the  roster in the 2006 FIVB Volleyball World League.

The following is the  roster in the 2006 FIVB Volleyball World League.

The following is the  roster in the 2006 FIVB Volleyball World League.

The following is the  roster in the 2006 FIVB Volleyball World League.

The following is the  roster in the 2006 FIVB Volleyball World League.



The following is the  roster in the 2006 FIVB Volleyball World League.

The following is the  roster in the 2006 FIVB Volleyball World League.

The following is the  roster in the 2006 FIVB Volleyball World League.

The following is the  roster in the 2006 FIVB Volleyball World League.

References

External links
Official website

2006
2006 in volleyball